"Fångad i en dröm" ("Captured in a Dream") is a song written and composed by Björn Skifs and Bengt Palmers, and the Swedish entry in the Eurovision Song Contest 1981, performed by Skifs. The song finished in tenth place.

Track listing 

 Swedish 7-inch single

A. "Fångad i en dröm" – 2:59
B. "Stackare, stackare" – 4:05

Charts

References 

1981 songs
1981 singles
Björn Skifs songs
EMI Records singles
Songs written by Björn Skifs
Swedish-language songs
Melodifestivalen songs of 1981
Eurovision songs of 1983
Eurovision songs of Sweden